St. Nicholas' Church in Bączal Dolny, Poland, is a Gothic church from the seventeenth-century. Since the 1970s, the church is part of the Museum of Folk Architecture in Sanok. 

The temple illustrates a typical Lesser Polish wooden church's architecture, and remains one of the most prized buildings of religious heritage in south-eastern Poland. 

The rector of the church from 1939 to 1948 was Florian Zając, a chaplain of the Home Army.

References

Jasło County
Churches in Podkarpackie Voivodeship